Descenders is a cycling video game developed by Dutch studio RageSquid and published by No More Robots. It was released for Linux, macOS, Windows, and Xbox One on 7 May 2019, for PlayStation 4 on 25 August 2020, for Nintendo Switch on 6 November 2020 and Xbox Series X/S on 8 June 2021. A mobile version for iOS and Android was released on 4 August 2022.

Gameplay
Descenders is a downhill mountain biking video game which puts players in different environments. Each level in the game is procedurally generated. In each level, the player races a downward course on a relatively dirt trail. During the trials, the player gains opportunities to perform tricks with their bicycle. Each level also presents a set of random objectives to complete, such as performing a trick a certain number of times, or finishing a race within a certain time. Each level also contains checkpoints which serve as respawn points upon bailing. Bail often, and the player fails the level.

Development
The game came about because the developers noted a lack of extreme sports video games on the market. Having grown up with several such games they decided to make their own to see if there was still a market for it. Prior to deciding on mountain biking the team considered other sports including Rock Climbing and Wing Suiting amongst others. At one point they prototyped a Pogo stick game which "was hilarious to look at, but it was hard to make a fun game out of it". In addition to Extreme Sport games the team also enjoyed Roguelikes such as Spelunky and FTL and decided to combine the two genres and "fell in love with the result and decided to continue along that path".

Early on the team struggled with getting the physics right feeling that a good physics system was make or break for the game. As such the team spent the first few months designing one before working on the rest of the game with RageSquid stating that the Skate series was the team's biggest inspiration for this aspect. For tricks RageSquid opted against having a list of preset button combinations instead opting for a system about "combining motions" which they stated makes the final game "more about expressing a personal style, which makes it more of a genuine extreme sports experience".

Reception

Descenders received "generally favorable" reviews, according to review aggregator Metacritic.

Mitch Bowman of PC Gamer felt optimistic about Descenders progress, criticizing its lack of variety in features while praising the variety in level design. Tim Rogers of Kotaku called the game "fast and smooth", and commented about the nauseating thrill the framerate gave him. Matthew Kato at Game Informer praised the branching level structure. Brendan Caldwell of Rock, Paper, Shotgun enjoyed the humour of the game, but was not impressed at the cosmetic rewards and the level design. Dante Douglas at Polygon gave the early access version of the game a 7.0, praising the procedural generation while criticizing the tight controls.

Notes

References

2019 video games
Cycling video games
Nintendo Switch games
PlayStation 4 games
Racing video games
Single-player video games
Video games developed in the Netherlands
Video games using procedural generation
Windows games
Xbox Cloud Gaming games
Xbox One games
Noodlecake Games games
No More Robots games